Alfredo De Franceschini (12 December 1902 – 11 June 1959) was an Italian professional footballer, who played as a midfielder, and football manager.

External links 
Profile at MagliaRossonera.it 

1902 births
1959 deaths
Italian footballers
Italian football managers
Association football midfielders
A.C. Milan players